Greenwood-Leflore Consolidated School District (GLCSD) is a school district serves Greenwood, Mississippi and the rest of Leflore County. It was established on July 1, 2019, as a merger of the Greenwood Public School District and the Leflore County School District.

The initial superintendent is Dr. Mary Brown. Its projected enrollment as of 2018 was to be over 5,000 students.

History
Upon creation of the consolidated district, no existing schools closed.

Operations
The former Greenwood School District headquarters is the headquarters of the consolidated district, with the superintendent and assistant superintendents housed there. Other officials are divided between that building and the former Leflore County School District offices.

There is one band, mass choir, and snow choir common to all of the schools in the consolidated district.

Schools
 7-12 secondary schools
Leflore County High School (Itta Bena)

 High schools (9-12)
Amanda Elzy High School (Unincorporated area)
Greenwood High School (Greenwood)

 Middle schools/junior high schools (7-8)
Amanda Elzy Junior High School (Unincorporated area)
Greenwood Middle School (Greenwood)

 Elementary schools (K-6)
Bankston Elementary School (Greenwood)
Leflore County Elementary School (Itta Benna)
Davis Elementary School (Greenwood) - In 1913 the school building was constructed.

2-6 schools
Threadgill Elementary School (Greenwood)

3-5 schools
East Elementary School
Prior to the 2019 merger it had grades K-5.

K-2 schools
Claudine F. Brown Elementary School (Unincorporated area)
Prior to the 2019 merger it had grades K-4.
 PK-1 schools
 Threadgill Primary School (Greenwood). It opened in 1935 as W.C. Williams Elementary School. Enrollment was 400 in 2015. In 2015 the closure of the school was proposed. On May 22, 2015, the Greenwood School District school board voted to close it, but in 2017 it reopened for grades Pre-Kindergarten-1. By 2019 the school adopted its current name.

Other
GLCSD Career & Technical Educational Center (Greenwood)

References

Further reading

External links
 
 Greenwood Leflore news - Greenwood Public School District
 2017 Mississippi Code Title 37 - Education Chapter 7 - School Districts; Boards of Trustees of School Districts Article 3 - Abolition, Alteration and Creation of Districts § 37-7-104.6. Administrative consolidation of Leflore County and Greenwood Municipal Separate School Districts into new countywide school district designated Greenwood-Leflore School District; procedure - Bill on Justia
 District boundary: https://www.mdek12.org/sites/default/files/documents/MBE/MDE-2018(8)/Tab-A-Greenwood-Leflore-boundary.pdf

Education in Leflore County, Mississippi
School districts in Mississippi
2019 establishments in Mississippi
School districts established in 2019